The Isuzu Bellett is a subcompact car produced by the Japanese manufacturer Isuzu between  1963 and 1973. Designed by Isuzu, the Bellett replaced the Isuzu Hillman Minx, manufactured by Isuzu under license with the Rootes Group.

The car was available as a four-door or two-door sedan, a rare two-door station wagon marketed as a commercial vehicle, called the Bellett Express, and an even rarer one ton commercial variant marketed as the Isuzu Wasp. There was also a four-door sedan with different bodywork and rear suspension, called the Bellett B. Lastly there was a two-door coupé and a fastback version of the same. After General Motors acquired a stake in Isuzu, the Bellett was replaced by GM's "global" T-car, initially called Isuzu Bellett Gemini and later simply Isuzu Gemini, which technically had little to do with its predecessor. A total of 170,737 original Belletts were manufactured.

The word Isuzu translated into English means "fifty bells." The nameplate "Bellett" referred to "a smaller Bellel", a previous, larger model manufactured by Isuzu.

Sedan
Launched in June 1963, the sedan used a 1.5 L OHV gasoline Inline-four engine and a 1.8 L diesel engine. The  diesel received very low gearing of 4.1:1 - optionally available to the 1.5 as well - resulting in a top speed of only . In April 1964, they were joined by the 1.3 L OHC inline-four engine already in use in the Wasp pickup truck, at which time a three-door van/wagon version called the Express (in Japan) was also added to the lineup. In 1966, the a mild facelift featured a revised front fascia, and the Bellett B model was added. At the very end of 1966, a 1.6 litre SOHC engine was added for the 1600 GT. In 1971 the Bellett range underwent a second facelift, which also marked the end of diesel-powered Belletts.

The Bellett was the first Isuzu to be exported to Europe, when a thousand cars were shipped to Finland in January 1965. Isuzu entered The Swiss market after exhibiting at the 1965 Geneva Salon. The Finnish importer also marketed Alfa Romeos and Jaguars, and accordingly used competition as their main advertising method. The Isuzu Bellett was the first Japanese car to be regularly imported to Sweden. Exports to Canada also started in March 1965 as well.

A 1.6-litre sedan line was assembled in New Zealand by Campbell Industries at Thames from 1968 to 1970. Initial production featured a silver grille and squared tail lamps; a facelift brought a new black grille and longer, rectangular tail lamps. The car was imported under '300 club' rules which encouraged assembly of up to 300 units a year, using as many locally made parts as possible. Isuzu car assembly stopped after GM took its stake; the next Isuzu to be built and sold in New Zealand was the 1977 Gemini, marketed by GMNZ as an Isuzu rather than a Holden as in Australia.

The Bellett was assembled under license by Francisco Motors Corporation in Las Piñas, Philippines from 1965 to 1974.

Bellett B

Introduced in November 1966 the Bellett B line was a simplified version with its own rear bodywork and larger luggage space, especially for commercial (mainly taxi) use. The B had a live rear axle with semi-elliptic leaf springs, which was cheaper and took up less space than the regular Bellett's independent rear suspension. The rear doors were the same as for the regular Bellett, but the section behind that was more squared in design, with rounded wheel openings and a reverse rake of the rear panel rather than the forward sloping design of the private use Bellett. Originally equipped with the 1.3 litre gasoline engine or the 1.8 diesel, a 1.5 litre engine which ran on LPG was added later in the year. This unit had  rather than the 72 of the regular G150. Another visual difference was the use of wide rectangular headlights rather than twin round units. A down-specced private use version called the "Bellett Special", using the 1.3-litre engine and the B's front clip, albeit with two-door sedan bodywork, was added in 1969. The Bellett B's suspension was also used for the larger Florian, which appeared in 1967.

GT

The Isuzu Bellett GT', launched in April 1964, was a two-door coupé with a  lower height than the sedan, fitted with a twin-carbureted 1.6 L OHV gasoline engine. It was the first Japanese car to be billed "GT" (Gran Turismo). September 1964 saw the arrival of a 1.5 L version of the GT, front disc brakes and some slight modifications to the front fascia.

There was also a 1500 Sport (1966), essentially a GT but with the two-door sedan bodywork. This was turned into the 1600 Sport in 1968, with the G161 SOHC engine.

GT-R
The GT-R, more specifically GT Type-R (for "racing"), was a racing version of the GT, also available to individual customers. First presented in September 1969, the GT-R featured a 1.6 L DOHC engine from the 117 Coupé, power brakes and numerous other modifications. Available only with two-door notchback coupé bodywork It was visually different from other Belletts primarily by a specific paint scheme, which included a completely black hood. The GT-R achieved many successes in racing, and has gained its own fan community. Only about 1,400 GT-Rs were manufactured.

In 2006, readers of Japanese collector car magazine Nostalgic Hero ranked the Bellett GT-R 10th in a list of the 50 greatest Japanese cars. Results were published in issue 116 (August 2006) as well as a Nostalgic Hero Extra Edition (Geibun Mooks No. 555) published April 20, 2007. The 1969 Bellett GT-R is a playable car in the Polyphony Digital video game Gran Turismo 4 for the PlayStation 2, and also in Gran Turismo  for PSP, Gran Turismo 5 and Gran Turismo 6 for the PlayStation 3.

Wasp
A coupe utility variant, the Isuzu Wasp, was introduced in 1963. It featured an all-steel box-chassis and body frame, and was produced in pickup and flatbed body styles. The Wasp was offered with the 1325 cc G130 gasoline engine and the 1764 cc C180 diesel engine. The 1500 cc Bellett engine was also offered on some export models, including the entire Australian shipment of 122 units which were all offered with a bench seat, 1500 cc Bellett motor and in a choice of trayback or styleside options.

The Wasp was built until 1972, when it was replaced by the Faster, known as the Chevrolet LUV in many markets.

Competition
As part of Isuzu's advertising effort in Finland, rallies and car orienteering events were entered. A Group 2-tuned four-door Bellett surprised many European commentators by finishing a "sensational" tenth in the 1966 1000 Lakes Rally.

MX1600
At the 1969 Tokyo Motor Show, Isuzu presented a concept car called Isuzu Bellett MX1600, designed by Tom Tjaarda. It was a mid-engined, rear-wheel drive 2-seater super sports car. Apart from sharing the 1.6 L engine with the GT-R, the MX1600 had little to do with any production Bellett, and it never materialized into a production vehicle, but it is said to have inspired the De Tomaso Pantera by the same stylist.

References

External links
 an Australian Bellett owners webpage (includes many photos and details)
 A listing of all Tjaarda's designs with photos, including the MX1600 and Pantera
 Isuzu Bellett specifications from histomobile.com
 Bellett.net Forums with history, pics, scanned brochures, tech tips and discussion (english language)

Bellett
Rear-wheel-drive vehicles
Subcompact cars
Coupés
Pickup trucks
Sedans
Station wagons
1970s cars
Cars introduced in 1963